Valdo Vannucci (born 4 May 1947) is an Italian politician and professor.

He was a member of the Italian Socialist Party and was elected councillor of the Province of Arezzo in 1985. He served as Mayor of Arezzo from 1990 to 1995 and also served several times as city councillor in Bibbiena.

Biography
Valdo Vannucci was born in Bibbiena, Italy in 1947.
He was appointed president of the Casentino mountain community.

See also
 List of mayors of Arezzo

References

External links
 Valdo Vannucci on interno.gov.it
 Valdo Vannucci on openpolis.it

1947 births
Living people
Italian Socialist Party politicians
21st-century Italian politicians
20th-century Italian politicians
Mayors of Arezzo